Walter Makes a Movie is a British short silent film, directed by Tom Seymour and Walter Forde in 1922. Forde plays a petty thief who steals from film star Pauline Highbrow (Pauline Peters). Pursued by the police he ends up in the Star Film Company's studio during the shooting of her latest melodrama.

This film is preserved in the National Film Archive. A version from a 1935 9.5mm home movie release is available to watch on YouTube channel "British Silents".

Further information on Forde and his silent movies can be found in Chapter Five of ebook British Silent Film Comedies available from Amazon.

1922 films
British silent short films
British black-and-white films
Films directed by Walter Forde